Todd Fitzgerald Day (born January 7, 1970) is an American former professional basketball player and current head coach at Philander Smith College in Little Rock, Arkansas. Day is the all-time leading scorer at the University of Arkansas, and played eight seasons in the NBA.  During the 2006 season, he played for the Blue Stars of Lebanon's WASL Club League.

High school career
Day played for his stepfather, Ted Anderson at Memphis's Hamilton High School, where he was a McDonald's All-American, and a 3rd Team Parade All-American. He also earned All-State and All-District honors during his prep career.  Day was named Tennessee's Mr. Basketball for Class AAA following his senior year in 1988.

Collegiate career
Day played college basketball at the University of Arkansas for coach Nolan Richardson, and was a four-year letterman ('89,'90,'91 and '92). Day broke Sidney Moncrief's school record for scoring with 2,395 points. Day was a member of the All-Southwest Conference Newcomer Team as a freshman, a member of the Arkansas unit that reached the NCAA Final Four as a sophomore, and a John Wooden First-Team All-America selection as both a junior and senior. Day helped Arkansas win three consecutive Southwest Conference regular season championships from 1989 to 1991, as well as three straight SWC Tournament championships, also from 1989 to 1991. Day was named the Most Outstanding Player for the 1990 SWC Tournament. 
In his final college season, he powered the Razorbacks to the Southeastern Conference regular seasons title, as well as the SEC West Division championship, in the school's first season in the league. His scoring average (22.7 ppg) was the third highest in school history. Day holds several school records, including career points (2,395), and points in a season (786). During Day's time at Arkansas, the Razorbacks made the NCAA Tournament every year, advancing to the second round in 1989, the Final Four in 1990, the Elite Eight in 1991, and the second round in 1992. 
He played for the US national team in the 1990 FIBA World Championship, winning the bronze medal. He averaged 6.3 points per game during the tournament, while helping the last collegiate team ever to represent the USA on a major international tournament win the bronze medal.

Professional career
Day was selected in the 1st round (8th pick) by the Milwaukee Bucks in the 1992 NBA Draft. He was joined in the first round by teammates Oliver Miller and Lee Mayberry, giving the Razorbacks three first round selections that year.  He was traded with Alton Lister to the Boston Celtics for Sherman Douglas on December 22, 1995. Day scored a career high 41 points against the Minnesota Timberwolves, tying Larry Bird's Celtic franchise record for points in a quarter with 24.

Day only reached the playoffs once in his eight NBA seasons, with the 1999-00 Phoenix Suns.   In nine games that postseason, Day contributed to a first-round upset of the defending champion San Antonio Spurs and a second-round loss to the Los Angeles Lakers. During his NBA career, Day also played for the Miami Heat, the Phoenix Suns and the Minnesota Timberwolves, averaging 12.3 points per game.

Day joined the Arkansas Rimrockers for their inaugural season in the ABA basketball league in 2004–05.  In their only season in the league, the Rimrockers had a record of 32–5, defeating the Bellevue Blackhawks 118–103 in Alltel Arena for the league championship.  Day finished the game with 32 points and 6 steals. Day was named 1st Team All-ABA and was an ABA All-Star.  Day helped Rayyan (Qatar) win the 16th FedEx FIBA Asia Champions Cup in 2005, scoring 24 points in the victory over Fastlink (Jordan). Day signed a free agent contract with the Detroit Pistons, but was released in training camp. Day returned to the ABA for the 2006–07 season, playing with the Arkansas Aeros. He was selected to play in the ABA All-Star Game on January 28, 2007, in Halifax, Nova Scotia. Day was averaging 21.4 points per game prior to the All-Star Game. Day also had a stint playing for the Harlem Globetrotters.

NBA career statistics

Regular season

|-
| align="left" | 1992–93
| align="left" | Milwaukee
| 71 || 37 || 27.2 || .432 || .293 || .717 || 4.1 || 1.6 || 1.1 || 0.7 || 13.8
|-
| align="left" | 1993–94
| align="left" | Milwaukee
| 76 || 39 || 28.0 || .415 || .223 || .698 || 4.1 || 1.8 || 1.4 || 0.7 || 12.7
|-
| align="left" | 1994–95
| align="left" | Milwaukee
| 82 || 81 || 33.1 || .424 || .390 || .754 || 3.9 || 1.6 || 1.3 || 0.8 || 16.0
|-
| align="left" | 1995–96
| align="left" | Milwaukee
| 8 || 0 || 21.4 || .310 || .200 || .923 || 2.8 || 0.6 || 0.5 || 0.4 || 9.1
|-
| align="left" | 1995–96
| align="left" | Boston
| 71 || 12 || 23.0 || .371 || .343 || .766 || 2.8 || 1.4 || 1.1 || 0.7 || 12.0
|-
| align="left" | 1996–97
| align="left" | Boston
| 81 || 27 || 28.1 || .398 || .362 || .773 || 4.1 || 1.4 || 1.3 || 0.6 || 14.5
|-
| align="left" | 1997–98
| align="left" | Miami
| 5 || 0 || 13.8 || .355 || .167 || .667 || 1.2 || 1.4 || 1.4 || 0.0 || 6.0
|-
| align="left" | 1999–00
| align="left" | Phoenix
| 58 || 1 || 16.2 || .394 || .388 || .667 || 2.2 || 1.1 || 0.8 || 0.4 || 6.8
|-
| align="left" | 2000–01
| align="left" | Minnesota
| 31 || 0 || 11.1 || .373 || .377 || .783 || 1.2 || 0.9 || 0.3 || 0.2 || 4.3
|- class="sortbottom"
| style="text-align:center;" colspan="2"| Career
| 483 || 197 || 25.3 || .406 || .345 || .739 || 3.4 || 1.5 || 1.1 || 0.6 || 12.3
|}

Playoffs

|-
| align="left" | 1999–00
| align="left" | Phoenix
| 9 || 0 || 11.1 || .457 || .313 || .500 || 1.1 || 0.4 || 0.4 || 0.1 || 4.7
|}

Coaching career
Day was named head coach for the Arkansas Impact of the Premier Basketball League, in December 2007.  The Impact began their season in January 2008 and played their home games in Little Rock's Barton Coliseum, but are no longer in operation. Day led the Impact to the 2008 Championship Game, losing to the Rochester Razorsharks 142–112. Day entered high school coaching when he was named head coach at the Memphis Academy of Health and Sciences, where he coached for five seasons. He became the head coach at his alma mater, Hamilton High School, when  former head coach Keelon Lawson resigned to join Josh Pastner's staff at the University of Memphis. He also worked as an assistant coach for Team Penny, a Memphis-based AAU team founded by head coach Penny Hardaway. In June 2016, Day was named head coach of the Men's Basketball program at Philander Smith College in Little Rock, AR. His son T.J. Day serves as an assistant coach for the team.

Personal
Todd Day was inducted as a member of the 2008 class of the Arkansas Sports Hall of Fame, and he was one of nine former Razorbacks inducted into the Southwest Conference Hall of Fame in November 2015. Day is a member of Alpha Phi Alpha fraternity.

References

External links
 Career statistics and player information from Basketball-reference.com

1970 births
Living people
All-American college men's basketball players
American expatriate basketball people in Argentina
American expatriate basketball people in Cyprus
American expatriate basketball people in Italy
American expatriate basketball people in Qatar
American men's basketball players
Argentino de Junín basketball players
Arkansas Razorbacks men's basketball players
Arkansas RimRockers players
ABA All-Star Game players
Basketball coaches from Illinois
Basketball coaches from Tennessee
Basketball players from Illinois
Basketball players from Memphis, Tennessee
Boston Celtics players
College men's basketball head coaches in the United States
Goodwill Games medalists in basketball
Harlem Globetrotters players
La Crosse Bobcats players
McDonald's High School All-Americans
Miami Heat players
Milwaukee Bucks draft picks
Milwaukee Bucks players
Minnesota Timberwolves players
Parade High School All-Americans (boys' basketball)
Philander Smith Panthers men's basketball coaches
Phoenix Suns players
Shooting guards
Sportspeople from Decatur, Illinois
Sportspeople from Memphis, Tennessee
United States men's national basketball team players
Victoria Libertas Pallacanestro players
1990 FIBA World Championship players
Competitors at the 1990 Goodwill Games